World Chronicle was a half-hour news and documentary television program broadcast internationally by the United Nations.  The series began production in 1980, and ceased production in 2006, after 1006 episodes.

External links
Archived Webcasts of World Chronicle Episodes

United Nations mass media
1980s documentary television series
1990s documentary television series
2000s documentary television series
1980 television series debuts
2006 television series endings
1980s television news shows
1990s television news shows
2000s television news shows